This is the discography for American alternative rock band Toadies.

Studio albums

Live albums

Extended plays 
Slaphead (1989) (self-released)
Velvet (1992) (self-released)
Pleather (1993) (Grass Records)
Live at Lollapalooza (2008) (iTunes exclusive)
Damn You All to Hell (2022)

Singles 

Split singles
Belated Valentines split w/ Slowpoke (1995) – "Not in Love" (David Byrne)

Demo releases 

4-track Demos (1989)
Slaphead (1989)
Chatterbox (1990)
Y're Cute (1995)

Compilations and soundtracks 

The following list includes only non-album and unreleased tracks.

Notes

References 

Alternative rock discographies
Discographies of American artists